The Norwegian Museum of Decorative Arts and Design is a museum in Oslo, Norway. Its collection includes clothing, textile, furniture, silver, glass, ceramics, and handicrafts. Since 2003, the museum has been administratively a part of the National Museum of Art, Architecture and Design (Nasjonalmuseet for kunst, arkitektur og design).

History
The museum was created on the initiative of Lorentz Dietrichson and Nicolay Nicolaysen. It was established in 1876 as one of the first of its kind in Europe. The first director was Henrik A. Grosch (1848-1929), nephew of the noted architect Christian Heinrich Grosch. The museum was located at St. Olavsgate 1 in Oslo. Since 1904 it has been located with the Norwegian National Academy of Craft and Art Industry in a building designed by Adolf Bredo Greve (1871-1931) and Ingvar M. O. Hjorth (1862-1927).

The museum had its premises in several places in central Oslo. Due to its relocation to the new National Museum in Oslo, the Museum of Decorative Arts and Design closed on October 16, 2016. Its collection will be part of the new museum when this opens in 2020.

References

External links
Kunstindustrimuseet website

1876 establishments in Norway
Art museums established in 1876
Art museums and galleries in Norway
Museums in Oslo
Decorative arts museums